Gabriel de Morais (born 6 March 2002) is a Brazilian footballer who plays for North Texas SC on loan from Alverca.

Career
de Morais played with the Athletico Paranaense between 2016 and 2020, helping Paranaense win the U-15 Championship in 2017. In 2020, he made the move to Portugal, joining Alverca. He made his Campeonato de Portugal debut on 25 April 2021.

On 5 August 2021, de Morais joined USL League One side North Texas SC on loan for the remainder of 2021 and the 2022 season.

References

2002 births
Living people
Brazilian footballers
Association football forwards
F.C. Alverca players
North Texas SC players
USL League One players
Expatriate footballers in Portugal
Expatriate soccer players in the United States
Brazilian expatriate sportspeople in Portugal
Brazilian expatriate sportspeople in the United States
Brazilian expatriate footballers